Zelleria callidoxa is a moth of the  family Yponomeutidae. It is found in Australia including Tasmania.

External links
Australian Faunal Directory
Yponomeutidae of Tasmania

Yponomeutidae
Moths described in 1893